Admiral Henrique Eduardo Passaláqua de Gouveia e Melo  (born 21 November 1960) is a Portuguese Navy officer, currently serving as the Chief of the Naval Staff, since December 2021.

Previously, while he was serving as Adjutant for Planning and Coordination of the Armed Forces General Staff, Gouveia e Melo rose to national prominence after being appointed coordinator of the Task Force for the successful national COVID-19 vaccination plan, that saw Portugal having the highest vaccination rates in the world. Gouveia e Melo had previously served as a Commander of the Portuguese Fleet (Comandante Naval) from 2017 to 2020 and, from 2017 to 2019, as Commander of the European Maritime Force (EUROMARFOR).

Due to his prominent role during the ongoing COVID-19 pandemic in Portugal, Gouveia e Melo was included in Jornal de Negócios's list of 50 Most Powerful People of 2021, which included both Portuguese and international personalities. His popularity has made Gouveia e Melo be tipped by the media as a potential future presidential candidate.

Early life and career 
Henrique Gouveia e Melo was born in 1960 in Quelimane, Mozambique, which at the time was the Overseas Province of Mozambique, a territory under Portuguese rule. He was the son of Manuel Henriques Gomes de Frias de Melo e Gouveia, of a family of aristocratic roots in the Beira Interior region, and his wife Maria Helena Pereira Passaláqua, of Italian descent.

He spent his youth between Quelimane and São Paulo in Brazil and, finally, Lisbon, where he went at age 18 to enrol at the Naval School as a cadet in 1979. Each Naval School class is referred to by the name of an historical figure assigned to it as a patron; that year's was First World War hero Carvalho Araújo. In September 1984, at age 23, he finished his studies and was promoted to the rank of midshipman.

At age 24, in September 1985, he volunteered in the Submarine Escadrille (Esquadrilha de Submarinos) and sailed in the Albacora-class submarines NRP Albacora, NRP Barracuda, and NRP Delfim in several operational roles as a garrison officer and, later, in command positions as a Chief Officer aboard the NRP Albacora and the NRP Barracuda. During his long service in the Submarine Escadrille, which only ended in 2002, he also commanded the submarines NRP Delfim and NRP Barracuda, led the escadrille's Training and Assessment Service (Serviço de Treino e Avaliação) and the Staff of the National Submarine Operating Authority (Estado-Maior da Autoridade Nacional para o Controlo de Operações de Submarinos; SUBOPAUTH).

After three years as a Navy Spokesman and having played a decisive role in the project for the acquisition of the new Tridente-class submarines, he commanded, from 2006 to 2008, the NRP Vasco da Gama (F330) frigate. He then returned to his activities as a submariner as the commander of the Submarine Escadrille, overseeing the necessary changes to adapt the military unit to the new submarines, namely, the sea trials and the commissioning of NRP Tridente (S160). Before his promotion to general officer ranks, he served as the Second Commander of the Naval Fleet, Director of Lighthouses, and Director of the Sea Rescue Institute (Instituto de Socorros a Náufragos).

He was promoted to Rear Admiral in April 2014, after which he was appointed Chief of Staff to the Chief of the Naval Staff, until 2016, and then briefly served as the Second Commander of the Naval Fleet, leading it in an interim capacity. He was promoted to Vice-Admiral in January 2017, after which he served as Commander of the Portuguese Fleet. At this time, he additionally served as Commander of the European Maritime Force (EUROMARFOR) until September 2019. From January 2020, he was named Adjutant for Planning and Coordination of the Armed Forces General Staff.

COVID-19 pandemic 

Gouveia e Melo took on a high-profile role during the COVID-19 pandemic, following his appointment as Coordinator of the COVID-19 Vaccination Plan Task Force, the unit set up by the Portuguese government to assure the strategic planning and logistics for the national mass immunization campaign. Gouveia e Melo was appointed to head the task force on 3 February 2021, following the resignation of the first coordinator, former Secretary of State for Health Francisco Ramos, over a "queue jumping" scandal, in which people not belonging to priority groups allegedly were receiving their vaccines before their turn.

After being relatively spared during the first surge of the pandemic due to an internationally-praised timely and effective response, Portugal was at the time under a second national lockdown as it was being particularly severely hit by a second wave: the country had the highest seven-day average of new coronavirus cases per 100,000 inhabitants in the world, and the record numbers of new cases and hospital admissions threatened to overwhelm the struggling National Health Service.

Gouveia e Melo began to wear only his green combat uniform in public as well and used not only "the language of war" but military language in public outreach attempts. By October 2021, 98% of the eligible population and 86% of the total population was vaccinated against Covid-19. 

On 4 October 2021, shortly after the Vaccination Task Force disbanded, Gouveia e Melo was awarded the Golden Globe for Merit and Excellence in a ceremony in Coliseu dos Recreios. As he was presented with the award by Francisco Pinto Balsemão, former Prime Minister and Chairman of Grupo Impresa, he received a standing ovation, and on his speech thanked every Portuguese that had contributed to the success of the vaccination effort and voiced his intention of leaving the trophy at the Ministry of Health.

Chief of the Naval Staff 
Gouveia e Melo was appointed Chief of the Naval Staff and promoted to the rank of Admiral, on 27 December 2021.

The appointment was not without controversy. His predecessor as Chief of the Naval Staff, Admiral António Mendes Calado, had been in office since 2018 and had in February 2021 been reappointed for a second term of no more than two years. Just as the COVID-19 Vaccination Task Force disbanded in September, the Minister of National Defence, João Gomes Cravinho, prematurely announced that the Government had petitioned the President of the Republic to dismiss Mendes Calado and to replace him with Gouveia e Melo. Earlier that year, Mendes Calado had openly criticised and shown reservations over the Government's proposal to make significant changes to the National Defence Law (Lei de Defesa Nacional) and the Organic Basic Law of the Organisation of the Armed Forces (Lei Orgânica de Bases da Organização das Forças Armadas, LOBOFA) in parliamentary hearings, with the Admiral's dismissal being considered by some as retaliation; former Chief of the Naval Staff Admiral Fernando Melo Gomes called it a "political purge" (saneamento) that was reminiscent of the PREC. The President, Marcelo Rebelo de Sousa, called the minister's announcement premature and a mistake, and did not dismiss Mendes Calado at the time. In December, the President announced that as the new National Defence laws with which Mendes Calado disagreed were about to be promulgated, the "new political cycle" made it now "the right moment" to replace the Chief of the Naval Staff. Mendes Calado publicly announced he was leaving his office "not of his own accord".

Gouveia e Melo was sworn-in by the President on 27 December, in a short ceremony at Belém Palace, without any speeches, and with the noted absence of his predecessor, Admiral Mendes Calado. Just before the ceremony, he was awarded a Gold Military Medal for Distinguished Services by Admiral António da Silva Ribeiro, Chief of the General Staff of the Armed Forces.

Distinctions

National orders 
 Grand Cross of the Military Order of Aviz (19 August 2021)
 Commander of the Military Order of Aviz (3 June 2004)

National military decorations
 Military Medal for Distinguished Services, Gold (4)
 Military Medal for Distinguished Services, Silver (5)
 Medal for Military Merit, 1st Class
 Medal for Military Merit, 2nd Class
 Medal for Military Merit, 3rd Class
 National Defence Medal, 1st Class
Medal of the Naval Cross, 3rd Class
 Exemplary Behaviour Medal, Gold

Other distinctions
 Honoris causa doctorate, NOVA University of Lisbon (16 December 2021)
 Honoris causa specialist degree, Guarda Polytechnic Institute (30 September 2021)

References 

1960 births
Living people
Commanders of the Order of Aviz
Grand Crosses of the Order of Aviz
Portuguese admirals
Golden Globes (Portugal) winners
Portuguese people of Italian descent